Steven Seagal: Lawman is an American reality television series that aired on A&E for its first two seasons and Reelz for its third. It stars actor, martial artist and musician Steven Seagal performing his duties as a reserve deputy sheriff in Jefferson Parish, Louisiana (season 1–2) and Maricopa County, Arizona (season 3). It premiered on December 2, 2009.

"I've been working as an officer in Jefferson Parish for two decades under most people's radar", said Seagal in the premiere episode, "The Way of the Gun." Seagal continues "I've decided to work with A&E on this series now, because I believe it's important to show the nation all the positive work being done here in Louisiana—to see the passion and commitment that comes from the Jefferson Parish Sheriff's Office in this post-Katrina environment." Seagal's current rank of Reserve Deputy Chief is largely ceremonial.

History 
According to Seagal, in the late 1980s, Jefferson Parish's longtime sheriff, Harry Lee, asked Seagal to train some of his deputies in martial arts. The actor further claimed that the success of these classes led to Lee asking Seagal to join the department as a reserve deputy. The LA Times article goes on to suggest that a black and white photo, purportedly showing Seagal's swearing in as Deputy in the 1980s, in fact showed the actor some 20 years older than would have been consistent with his claim. Additionally, the article notes that the Peace Officer Standards & Training organization, which accredits police officers, had no record of Seagal being certified.

Production 
On April 14, 2010, The Jefferson Parish Sheriff's Office announced that production of second season episodes had been halted due to a lawsuit filed against Steven Seagal on April 12, 2010 by his former personal assistant, Kayden Nguyen. Nguyen claimed Seagal committed sexual harassment, illegally trafficked women for sex, failed to prevent sexual harassment, retaliated against her, wrongly terminated her employment, and made false representations about her employment. Nguyen also alleges that she was asked to join Seagal's harem, which included two Russian women; Nguyen was to be a replacement. On April 13, 2010, Seagal's attorney Marty Singer said that the lawsuit was "... a ridiculous and absurd claim by a disgruntled ex-employee who was fired". Nguyen sued for over one million dollars.

Jefferson Parish Sheriff Newell Normand announced he would not launch an investigation into Nguyen's accusations unless she filed a criminal complaint against him with the Jefferson Parish sheriff's department. She never filed a complaint and on July 15, 2010, Nguyen dropped her lawsuit. Six days later, it was announced on the A&E website's message board that new episodes of Steven Seagal: Lawman would begin airing in October 2010, but no specific date was given.

Season 3 production 
In February 2011, A&E announced that the series would begin production on Season 3 episodes.  Two episodes were scheduled to be aired beginning on January 4, 2012.  The episodes were announced by A&E, who created Facebook page for the series and listed in the TV guide. Shortly before the episodes were to be aired, the web and Facebook pages about the series were removed. A&E made no announcements about the sudden suspension of Season 3 or whether there would be a third season. A&E didn't answer inquiries, letters, or emails from fans.

It was announced on May 16, 2013, that the third season would air on Reelz starting in January 2014. Episodes from the first two seasons began airing on June 6, 2013. Season 3 premiered on January 2, 2014, with the airing of two new episodes.  A third new episode aired on January 9, 2014.  Five additional episodes for Season 3 have yet to be aired.

Episodes

Season 1 (2009–10)

Season 2 (2010)

Season 3 (2014)

Reception 
The debut episode drew a network record 3.4 million viewers.

Critical reception to the series was mixed.  Tim Goodman of the San Francisco Chronicle praised the show for being "compelling", and praised Steven Seagal for keeping his law enforcement career largely a secret "... even when his career could have used a boost".  However, Alan Sepinwall of The Star-Ledger excoriated the series and its star: "... with his new reality show ... Seagal has cemented his position as an accidental comedy savant. It's easily the funniest thing he's done since the climactic speech from On Deadly Ground (his infamous directorial debut about evil oil companies polluting the Alaskan wilderness), and one of the more entertaining additions to the Has-Beens On Parade reality subgenre".

Questions over Seagal's law enforcement credentials 
Steven Seagal claims to hold certification by the California Peace Officer Standards and Training (POST) commission. However, according to a Los Angeles Times commentary critical of the claims, neither the California nor Louisiana POST organizations have records of Seagal's certification.  But in the state of Louisiana, POST accreditation is not required for people holding certain positions in law enforcement if they are partnered with a POST-accredited officer.

Home releases
 Season 1 (2010, Australia, 2 discs)

(Due to a production error, episode 8 ("Medicine Man"), was not included on the set.)

 Season 2 (2011, Australia, 2 discs)

References 

2000s American reality television series
2010s American reality television series
2009 American television series debuts
English-language television shows
A&E (TV network) original programming
Television series by ITV Studios
Steven Seagal